Thomas Lyle Ostrow (born March 20, 1959) professionally known as Tom Lyle is an American guitarist, songwriter, record producer and Audiophile. Ostrow first gained recognition in late 1981 as a bass player for Government Issue.

Early life 
Ostrow was born in 1959 in New York. He started playing music from an early age. Ostrow acquired his initial music experience while at a public school system playing percussion, drums, tympani, and orchestra.

Career 
In October 31, 1981, Ostrow played his first show with the DC hardcore punk band Government Issue, substituting for their bassist, Brian Baker. After a month, he became the band’s permanent bass player and baker became the band’s guitarist. He performed his first show in December 1981 in Washington, Before joining Government Issue. The band's albums were originally released by the label Dischord Records. They were later released by Fountain Of Youth Records, Giant Records, and Dr. Strange Records. Ostrow was founding member of the band, Beaver, He started it as a solo project and then it became a real band.

In early 1982, Brian Baker left Government Issue and rejoined Minor Threat which resulted in Ostrow becoming the new guitaist for the band. He performed his first show as the main guitarist at Wilson Center. Ostrow wrote the music on some of the band’s mini-LP “Boycott Stabb” which was released in early 1983, but on all future releases, he wrote the majority of the music. After the band’s last two albums, You and Crash, the band broke up in June of 1989. Ostrow has also worked with Pittsburgh’s band Half-Life. Later on, he got the chance to work with Black Market Baby at the end of his career. 

In 2018, Jason Blackmore, an American director made documentary, Records Collecting Dust II underlying questions to punk musicians of the East Coast of the United State that featured ostrow and others. He was also featured in another documentary film, Salad Days by Scott Crawford. 

Ostrow started his career as an editor at The Sensible Sound in 1997 and his work was picked by The Washington Post.  After his editorial career at The Sensible Sound, Ostrow became a musical instrument reviewer for Enjoy The Music.

Discography

Vocals 

 Give Us Stabb or Give Us Death (1985)
 Never Give In (1989)
 Sanctuary (1992)

Production 

 The Lion (2003)
 Coulda... Shoulda... Woulda ‎(2005)
 The Complete Sessions ‎(2012)
 Mutiny / United 121

Technical 

 Live! (1985)
 Public Flipper Limited (1986)
 Strange Wine E.P. (1989)
 Lyle (1991)
 Beyond (1991)
 Sanctuary (1992) 
 Coulda... Shoulda... Woulda (2005)
 Boycott Stabb (1983)
 Void (12) (2011)
 Someone's Bleeding (2016)
 Last Of the Pariahs (2017)
 Salad Days (2018)
 Cherry Smash (2018)
 Live At the Wilson Center (2022)
 Lineup ‎(2022)

Visual 

 Make An Effort EP (1983)
 Boycott Stabb (1983)
 Give Us Stabb or Give Us Death (1985)
 The Fun Just Never Ends (1985)
 Government Issue (1986)

Acting, Literary & Spoken 

 No Way Out '82 (1990)

Books 
following are the books that tom lyle is featured in

 Dance of days: Two Decades of Punk in the Nation's Capital
 American Hardcore (Second Edition): A Tribal History
 Going Underground: American Punk 1979–1989

References

External Links 

 Tom Lyle at IMDb

1959 births
Living people
American rock guitarists
American male guitarists
American rock bass guitarists
American male bass guitarists
American punk rock guitarists
Guitarists from New York (state)
20th-century American guitarists
21st-century American guitarists
Government Issue members